Lepteutypa cupressi is a plant pathogen which causes a disease ("Cypress canker") in Cupressus, Thuja, and related conifer types.

The name Seiridium cupressi (formerly Coryneum cupressi) is for the anamorph of this fungus, that is, it is used for the asexual form.  Now that it is known to have a sexual stage the genus name Lepteutypa should take precedence.

References

External links 
 USDA ARS Fungal Database

Xylariales
Fungal tree pathogens and diseases
Fungi described in 1973